Satovcha Municipality is a municipality in southwestern Bulgaria and is one of the municipalities in the Blagoevgrad Province.

Geography 

It covers the Southwestern Rhodope Mountains. 14 settlemements belong to the municipality with a total of  inhabitants (21.07.05) and a territory of  km2. Administrative, industrial and cultural center of the municipality is the village of Satovcha.

Population 
As of December 2018, there are 14,263 inhabitants living in the municipality of Satovcha, down from 18,265 inhabitants in 2000. The municipality of Satovcha has a Muslim majority (over 85% of the total population). Nearly all of them are Bulgarian Muslims (on the contrary, most Muslims in Bulgaria are ethnic Turks).

Satovcha has a declining birth rate as young women are moving out of the villages.

Religion 
According to the latest Bulgarian census of 2011, the religious composition, among those who answered the optional question on religious identification, was the following:

Settlements in the municipality 

 Bogolin
 Dolen
 Fargovo
 Godeshevo
 Kochan
 Kribul
 Osina
 Pletena
 Satovcha
 Slashten
 Tuhovishta
 Vaklinovo
 Valkosel
 Zhizhevo

References

External links

Municipalities in Blagoevgrad Province
Chech